Paul-Georg Kleffel (7 September 1920 – 19 February 2020 in Bonn) was a German mechanized infantry commander and recipient of the Knight's Cross of the Iron Cross during World War II. The Knight's Cross of the Iron Cross was awarded to recognise extreme battlefield bravery or successful military leadership. After the war he joined the Bundeswehr of West Germany and achieved a general's rank.

Career

Oberleutnant Kleffel was a company commander in the reconnaissance battalion of the 3rd Panzer Division during early 1944. During the division’s defense of Orhei, on 13 April, the Soviets succeeded in reaching a defile in regimental strength just short of a patch of woods to the east of Orhei. From where his company was positioned Kleffel determined if the Russians made it to the woods they would be in a position to compromise the division’s entire defensive position. He launched a counterattack with his eight APCs, and despite fire from Russian AT guns he was able to reach the defile and opened fire, scattering the Russian infantry that were gathered there. He continued to pursue the Russian regiment across the bridge where it had come from, inflicting heavy losses, and pulled back across before the Russians were able to take countermeasures. For his successful spoiling attack Kleffel was awarded the Knight’s Cross.

Awards & decorations

 Iron Cross
 2nd Class
 1st Class
 Knight's Cross of the Iron Cross on 14 May 1944 as Chef 4./Panzer-Aufklärungs-Abteilung 3
 German Cross in Gold on 16 November 1943 as Oberleutnant 4./Panzer-Aufklärungs-Abteilung 3
 Officer Cross of the Order of Merit of the Federal Republic of Germany 1973
 Commander Cross of the Order of Merit of the Federal Republic of Germany 1979

References

Citations

Bibliography

External links
Awards Page

1920 births
2020 deaths
Recipients of the Knight's Cross of the Iron Cross
Lieutenant generals of the German Army
Commanders Crosses of the Order of Merit of the Federal Republic of Germany
Recipients of the Gold German Cross
People from Coesfeld (district)
Military personnel from North Rhine-Westphalia
Bundeswehr generals